Biopolyethylene (also known as renewable polyethylene) is polyethylene made out of ethanol, which becomes ethylene after a dehydration process. It can be made from various feedstocks including sugar cane, sugar beet, and wheat grain.

The final product is indistinguishable from conventional polyethylene, and thus is recyclable in the same chain established for conventional PE.

The first plant
Ethanol-based chemical pole, totally integrated from sugarcane to polyethylene, was recently announced by The Dow Chemical Company, in conjunction with Crystals, a large sugar and ethanol producer in Brazil. The pole is said to be projected to produce 770 million pounds per year of renewable LLDPE (linear low-density polyethylene), will begin construction in 2008, and is slated to start production in 2011. The amount of ethanol needed to make one tonne of polyethylene is roughly two tonnes, as dehydration takes half of the weight in water, from the sugarcane-based ethanol, before converting into ethylene.
Braskem is the world leader in the production of biopolymer, with the Green Polyethylene – I'm green, a thermoplastic resin produced from ethylene made from sugarcane ethanol, a 100% renewable raw material which helps reduce greenhouse gas emissions. The production started in 2010 and is located in Triunfo, South of Brazil.pp

Benefits 
Renewable polyethylene is non-biodegradable and can be recycled in the same waste streams as traditional polyethylenes (HDPE, LDPE, LLDPE) as it is chemically identical.

Disadvantages
Producing feedstock for biobased plastics relies upon intensive agriculture, potentially contributing to deforestation in order to clear land for agricultural use. Large-scale production of feedstock also requires inputs such as fossil fuels, fertilizers, and pesticides.

Production
Today Braskem industrial unit has an annual production capacity of 200 tonne of Green Polyethylene. Green PE has the same properties, performance, and application versatility as fossil-based polyethylene, which makes it a drop-in replacement in the plastic production chain. For these same reasons, it is also recyclable in the same recycling chain used by traditional polyethylene.
Because it is part of the portfolio of high-density polyethylene (HDPE) and linear low-density polyethylene (LLDPE) products, Green PE rapidly became an option for applications in rigid and flexible packaging, closures, bags, and other products. In January 2014, the family of low-density polyethylene (LDPE) was added to the product portfolio, effectively covering additional applications in packaging and films.

References

Plastics